Jabou Jawo (born 18 April 1962) is a Gambian sprinter. She competed in the 100 metres at the 1984 Summer Olympics and the 1988 Summer Olympics. She was the first woman to represent the Gambia at the Olympics.

References

External links
 

1962 births
Living people
Athletes (track and field) at the 1984 Summer Olympics
Athletes (track and field) at the 1988 Summer Olympics
Gambian female sprinters
Olympic athletes of the Gambia
Athletes (track and field) at the 1978 Commonwealth Games
Athletes (track and field) at the 1982 Commonwealth Games
Commonwealth Games competitors for the Gambia
Place of birth missing (living people)
Olympic female sprinters